"Dark Passenger" is a single by Heavy metal band Holy Grail, taken from Ride the Void.

Track listing

Personnel
Blake Mount - Bass
Tyler Meahl - Drums
Eli Santana - Guitars
James-Paul Luna - Vocals
Alex Lee - Guitars

References 

2012 singles
2012 songs